Tata Naka is a dress label owned by Georgian twin sisters Tamara and Natasha Surguladze based in London, UK.

Born in Tbilisi, Georgia the sisters moved in 1996 to London where they graduated from Central Saint Martins and created their label.

References

External links
 

Clothing brands of the United Kingdom
Fashion designers from Georgia (country)
Alumni of Central Saint Martins